DnaA  is a replication initiation factor which promotes the unwinding or denaturation of DNA at oriC, during DNA replication in prokaryotes.

DNAA may also refer to:
Nnamdi Azikiwe International Airport located in Abuja, FCT, Nigeria. Its ICAO airport code is DNAA